Challengers is an upcoming American romantic sports comedy film directed by Luca Guadagnino from a screenplay by Justin Kuritzkes. Its cast includes Zendaya, Mike Faist, and Josh O'Connor.

Challengers is scheduled for release on September 15, 2023, by Metro-Goldwyn-Mayer.

Premise
The wife and coach of a famed tennis player in the middle of a losing streak signs him up for a Challenger event, where they discover he will compete against his wife's former lover.

Cast
 Zendaya as Tashi Donaldson 
 Mike Faist as Art Donaldson
 Josh O'Connor as Patrick Zweig

Production
It was announced in February 2022 that Metro-Goldwyn-Mayer had landed the film, which would see Luca Guadagnino direct and Zendaya, Josh O'Connor and Mike Faist cast to star. Zendaya will also serve as a producer on the film. Sayombhu Mukdeeprom serves as cinematographer. In a 2022 interview with Collider, Guadagnino cited Kuritzkes' screenplay, Amy Pascal, and Zendaya as inspirations for making the film.

Principal photography began on May 3, 2022, in Boston, where a casting call took place for local residents to audition to play tennis players, general extras, and stand-ins. In preparation for her role, Zendaya spent three months training with pro-tennis player-turned-coach Brad Gilbert. Filming occurred in and around the Back Bay and East Boston neighborhoods. Filming wrapped on June 26, 2022. Guadagnino visited Zendaya on the set of Dune: Part Two in order to complete ADR for Challengers. Trent Reznor and Atticus Ross will compose the film's score, having previously worked with Guadagnino on Bones and All.

Release 
Challengers is scheduled to be released on September 15, 2023. It was previously scheduled for release on August 11, 2023.

References

External links
 

Upcoming films
American sports comedy films
Films directed by Luca Guadagnino
Films shot in Boston
Films produced by Amy Pascal
Films scored by Atticus Ross
Films scored by Trent Reznor
Metro-Goldwyn-Mayer films
Tennis films
2020s English-language films
2020s American films